Kilianwali is a village in Fazilka district of Punjab, India. It is seven kilometers away from Abohar. This village was founded by Lal Singh Jakhar. Its  full name is Kilianwali Lal Singh.

Pin code : 151211
Cities and towns in Fazilka district